Lindhe is a surname. Notable people with the surname include:

 Jan Lindhe (born 1935), Swedish periodontist
 Martin "Bassic" Lindhe (born 1971), Swedish musician and composer